Heľpa is a village and municipality in Brezno District, in the Banská Bystrica Region of central Slovakia.

History
In historical records, the village was first mentioned in 1549. In 1551 it  Walachian settlers established here and Walachian Law was applied.

Genealogical resources

The records for genealogical research are available at the state archive "Statny Archiv in Banska Bystrica, Slovakia"

 Roman Catholic church records (births/marriages/deaths): 1736-1909 (parish A)
 Greek Catholic church records (births/marriages/deaths): 1775-1928 (parish B)
 Lutheran church records (births/marriages/deaths): 1828-1937 (parish B)

See also
 List of municipalities and towns in Slovakia

External links
https://web.archive.org/web/20080111223415/http://www.statistics.sk/mosmis/eng/run.html
https://web.archive.org/web/20070504071605/http://www.horehronie.pkdesign.sk/index.php?option=com_content&task=view&id=21&Itemid=42
http://www.e-obce.sk/obec/helpa/helpa.html
http://www.helpa.sk
Surnames of living people in Helpa

Villages and municipalities in Brezno District